Acianthera binotii is a species of orchid plant native to Brazil.

References 

binotii
Flora of Brazil
Plants described in 1880